Rotterdam is a town in Greater Letaba Local Municipality in the Limpopo province of South Africa. It is named after Rotterdam in the Netherlands.

References

Populated places in the Greater Letaba Local Municipality